"Djôn'maya (sometimes simplified as "Djon maya") is a song composed and recorded by Burkinabé singer-songwriter and musician Victor Démé and is considered his signature tune. After years of interpreting the song live, he recorded a studio version in his self-titled debut album Victor Démé in 2008 on the independent Chapa Blues Records in France.

Djon maya maï
In 2014, the Electro, Nu-Disco and Deep House DJ record producers Synapson recorded a remake of the song featuring Victor Démé. The single renamed "Djon maya maï" charted in France and Belgium reaching number 12 in SNEP French Singles Chart.

Track list
"Djon maya maï" (radio edit) (3:04)
"Djon maya maï" (original) (3:14)
"Djon maya maï" (extended) (4:49)

Charts
Synapson feat. Victor Démé version

References

2014 singles
2008 songs
Parlophone singles